Bridget Shamim Bangi (born 6 July 1993) is a Ugandan badminton player. who started playing badminton at age 13 at Mariam High School. At age 21, she finished her degree in Insurance and Banking at Ndejje University. She competed at the 2010 and 2018 Commonwealth Games.

Achievements

African Championships 
Women's doubles

BWF International Challenge/Series (5 titles, 5 runners-up) 
Women's singles

Women's doubles

Mixed doubles

 BWF International Challenge tournament
 BWF International Series tournament
 BWF Future Series tournament

References

External links
 

1993 births
Living people
People from Kampala District
Ugandan female badminton players
Badminton players at the 2010 Summer Youth Olympics
Badminton players at the 2010 Commonwealth Games
Badminton players at the 2018 Commonwealth Games
Commonwealth Games competitors for Uganda
Competitors at the 2011 All-Africa Games
Competitors at the 2015 African Games
African Games competitors for Uganda